Fengqi Road is an interchange station between Lines 1 and 2 of the Hangzhou Metro in China. Service on Line 1 commenced on 24 November 2012 along with the rest of the stations on Line 1, while service on Line 2 began on 3 July 2017. It is located in the Xiacheng District of Hangzhou.

References

Railway stations in Zhejiang
Railway stations in China opened in 2012
Hangzhou Metro stations